Mount Massam is a broad ice-covered mountain about  west of Mount Lindley, in the Churchill Mountains of Antarctica. It was named by the Holyoake, Cobham, and Queen Elizabeth Ranges Party of the New Zealand Geological Survey Antarctic Expedition (1964–65) for D. Massam, a member of the party.

References

Mountains of Oates Land